Ride on the Edge (stylized as RIDE ON THE EDGE) is the debut album of Japanese rock band, Granrodeo. It was released on 25 July 2007.

It is composed with songs from Game and Anime and Insert Song, but it is also contains original songs. Many songs have been released as singles, for this album, some songs were a re-remake.

Song Information 
 "Go For It!" was used as the opening theme to the 2005 anime television series IGPX.
 "Infinite Love" was used as the opening theme to the 2006 TV Season 1 anime "Koi suru Tenshi Angelique".
 "Decadence" was used as the ending theme to the 2006 anime television series Demon Prince Enma.
  was used as the opening theme to the 2007 Season 2 anime television series "Koi suru Tenshi Angelique".
 "style GR" mark the remake of 2 previously written songs by the band:
  was used as a Character song in the Kimi ga Nozomu Eien series, sung by Takayuki Narumi starring Kishō Taniyama (also made by Kishō and Masaaki).
 "LAST SMILE" was used as an extra song to the Character song in the Kimi ga Nozomu Eien series, also sung by Kishō Taniyama (also made by Kishō and Masaaki).

Track listing

Personnel 
 Kishow: vocals, lyrics
 E-Zuka: lead guitar, backing vocals, Arranging

Cover 
"Infinite Love" was covered by Sid respectively, on the 2020 Granrodeo tribute album Rodeo Freak.

Charts

References
Official mobile site
『RIDE ON THE EDGE』ランティス紹介ページ

2007 debut albums
Granrodeo albums